The 1997–98 FIRA Tournament was a rugby union tournament organized by the Fédération Internationale de Rugby Amateur (FIRA). Only minnow teams participated because the strongest 15 teams were playing the qualification for the Rugby World Cup.

The teams were divided into three pools, with the winners being Latvia, Luxembourg and Austria. No championship title was awarded.

Pool "Silver" (Division 2)

Pool "Bronze" (Division 3)

Pool "Bowl" (Division 4)

Bibliography 
 Francesco Volpe, Valerio Vecchiarelli (2000), 2000 Italia in Meta, Storia della nazionale italiana di rugby dagli albori al Sei Nazioni, GS Editore (2000) .
 Francesco Volpe, Paolo Pacitti (Author), Rugby 2000, GTE Gruppo Editorale (1999).

1997–98
1997–98 in European rugby union
1998 rugby union tournaments for national teams
1997 rugby union tournaments for national teams